Asyia Naz Tanoli is a Pakistani politician who had been a member of the National Assembly of Pakistan, from June 2013 to May 2018.

Political career

She was elected to the National Assembly of Pakistan as a candidate of Pakistan Muslim League (N) on a reserved seat for women from Punjab in 2013 Pakistani general election.

References

Living people
Pakistan Muslim League (N) politicians
Punjabi people
Pakistani MNAs 2013–2018
Women members of the National Assembly of Pakistan
Year of birth missing (living people)
21st-century Pakistani women politicians